Dr. Paul König served as the International Commissioner of the Ring deutscher Pfadfinderverbände and led the German contingent to the 9th World Scout Jamboree.

In 1974, König was awarded the 88th Bronze Wolf, the only distinction of the World Organization of the Scout Movement, awarded by the World Scout Committee for exceptional services to world Scouting.

References

External links

complete list
https://www.dpsgwegberg.de/geschichte/baden-powell.html
http://www.dpsg-st-toenis.de/der-stamm/
http://downloads.eo-bamberg.de/11/1071/1/37953781859877271914.pdf

Recipients of the Bronze Wolf Award
Year of birth missing
Scouting and Guiding in Germany